Federal Highway 45 (La Carretera Federal 45) (Fed. 45) is the free (libre) part of the federal highways corridors (los corredores carreteros federales), and connects Ciudad Juárez, Chihuahua through the Chihuahuan Desert to Panales, Hidalgo. 

It is operated under the management of the Secretariat of Communications and Transportation. Custody is the responsibility of "The Federal Highway Police", which in turn is part of the Federal Police (Mexico) (PF). Fed. 45 is part of the Pan-American Highway.   Federal Highway 45D is the tolled part of the route; in some areas the two run in parallel with the tolled section being faster.

Route
The cities that are connected from north to south are Ciudad Juárez, Chihuahua City, Durango City, Zacatecas City, San Francisco de los Romo, Aguascalientes City, León, Guanajuato, Irapuato, Celaya, Guanajuato, Salamanca, Guanajuato, Querétaro City, Portezuelo, and Panales.

Major intersections

References

045
Transportation in Hidalgo
Transportation in Querétaro
Chihuahuan Desert
Aguascalientes City
Ciudad Juárez
Durango City
Guanajuato City
León, Guanajuato
Querétaro City
Rio Conchos
Zacatecas City